Bosnia and Herzegovina competed at the 2012 Summer Olympics in London, United Kingdom from 27 July to 12 August 2012. This was the nation's sixth appearance at the Summer Olympics.

Olympic Committee of Bosnia and Herzegovina (OKBIH) sent a total of 6 athletes to the Games, 4 men and 2 women, to compete only in athletics, judo, shooting, and swimming. Bosnian athletes included Kenyan-born marathon runner Lucija Kimani, and rifle shooter Nedžad Fazlija, who participated at his fifth Olympic games without winning an Olympic medal. Heavyweight judoka Amel Mekić became the nation's flag bearer for the second time at the opening ceremony. Bosnia and Herzegovina, however, has yet to win its first Olympic medal as an independent nation.

Athletics

Bosnian and Herzegovinian athletes have so far achieved qualifying standards in the following athletics events (up to a maximum of 3 athletes in each event at the 'A' Standard, and 1 at the 'B' Standard):

Key
 Note – Ranks given for track events are within the athlete's heat only
 Q = Qualified for the next round
 q = Qualified for the next round as a fastest loser or, in field events, by position without achieving the qualifying target
 NR = National record
 N/A = Round not applicable for the event
 Bye = Athlete not required to compete in round

Men

Women

Judo

Men

Shooting

Men

Swimming

Bosnian and Herzegovinian  swimmers have so far achieved qualifying standards in the following events (up to a maximum of 2 swimmers in each event at the Olympic Qualifying Time (OQT), and 1 at the Olympic Selection Time (OST)):

Men

Women

See also
Bosnia and Herzegovina at the 2012 Winter Youth Olympics

References

External links

Nations at the 2012 Summer Olympics
2012
2012 in Bosnia and Herzegovina sport